Ge Zhen (Chinese: 葛振; Pinyin: Gě Zhèn; born 23 June 1987 in Qingdao) is a Chinese professional footballer who currently plays as a defender for Qingdao Youth Island.

Club career
Ge started his professional career with China League Two side Anhui Jiufang in 2005. He made an impression within the team as Anhui won promotion to the second tier at the end of the 2007 season. In January 2011, Ge transferred to another China League One club Guangdong Sunray Cave after Anhui Jiufang dissolved. He played 35 league matches for Guangdong in the 2011 and 2012 season.

Ge moved to Chinese Super League side Shanghai Shenxin on a free transfer in January 2013. With a high prize by the team manager Zhu Jiong, he quickly established himself within the team. On 8 March 2013, he made his Super League debut in the first league match of the season which Shanghai Shenxin lost to Guangzhou Evergrande 5–1. He played 26 league matches in the 2013 season.

On 6 January 2015, Ge transferred to fellow Chinese Super League side Hangzhou Greentown. On 8 July 2015, he made his debut for Hangzhou in a 2015 Chinese FA Cup against Henan Jianye, coming on as a substitute for Wang Xiao in the 56th minute. He made his league debut for the club on 19 July 2015 in a 0–0 away draw against Henan Jianye. He played nine league matches for Hangzhou in the 2015 season as Hangzhou Greentown relegated to the second tier. He became a regular starter in the 2016 season and was promoted as team captain in the 2017 season.

On 2 January 2018, Ge joined China League One side Shenzhen FC on a free transfer. He would make his debut in a league game on 4 April 2018 against Beijing Enterprises Group F.C. in a 2-1 defeat. After the game he would gradually establish himself as a regular within the team and go on to win promotion with the club at the end of the 2018 China League One campaign. After three seasons with the club he was loaned out to second tier club Meizhou Hakka where he played in a 21 league games to help guide the club to gain promotion to the top tier after coming second within the division at the end of the 2021 China League One campaign. On 28 January 2022, Ge would transfer to second tier club Qingdao Youth Island on a free transfer.

Career statistics 
Statistics accurate as of match played 16 December 2022.

References

External links
 

1987 births
Living people
Chinese footballers
Footballers from Qingdao
Anhui Jiufang players
Guangdong Sunray Cave players
Shanghai Shenxin F.C. players
Zhejiang Professional F.C. players
Shenzhen F.C. players
Meizhou Hakka F.C. players
Association football defenders
Chinese Super League players
China League One players
China League Two players